En Aasai Rasave is a 1998 Indian Tamil-language drama film directed by Kasthuri Raja. The film stars Sivaji Ganesan and Murali while Raadhika, Roja and Suvalakshmi all play other supporting roles. The film, which focussed on the lives of karakattam dance artists, released on 28 August 1998.

Plot 
Valayapathi is an karakattam artist who is revered. Azhagurani is a well-to-do rich woman who falls in love with him and gets married leaving her riches behind. Due to a misunderstanding, they separate leaving their child Muthumani with Valayapathi who brings him up in the karakattam tradition. Manoranjitham is in love with Muthumani.

Enter Nagajyoti who claims she is the best and prods Valayapathu/Muthumani into a competition thereby gaining entry into their lives. She slowly turns the tide and Muthumani and her fall in love. It is revealed that Nagajyoti is Muthumani's cross-cousin and has come in with the ulterior motive of reuniting Azhagurani, her aunt, and Valayapathi. Does she succeed?

Cast 
Sivaji Ganesan as Valayapathi
Raadhika as Azhagurani
Murali as Muthumani
Roja as Nagajyoti
Vijayakumar
Suvalakshmi as Manoranjitham
Vinu Chakravarthy
Senthil
Manivannan
Delhi Ganesh
G. Ramachandran (producer)
R. Sundarrajan
Manorama
 Mahanadhi Shankar

Soundtrack 
The music of this album was scored by Deva. Lyrics were written by Kasthuri Raja.

References

External links 

1998 films
Indian drama films
1990s Tamil-language films
Films scored by Deva (composer)
Films directed by Kasthuri Raja